Riccardo Capellini (born 1 March 2000) is an Italian professional footballer who plays as a defender for  club Benevento.

Club career

Juventus
He joined Juventus in June 2015. He eventually joined their Under-19 side and participated in Campionato Primavera 1 and also 2017–18 and 2018–19 editions of the UEFA Youth League. He was also included for the 2018–19 Serie C squad of Juventus U23, but did not see any time on the field for them that season.

Loan to Pistoiese
On 22 August 2019, he joined Serie C club Pistoiese on a season-long loan.
He made his professional Serie C debut for Pistoiese on 25 August 2019 in a game against AlbinoLeffe, substituting Paolo Dametto in the 69th minute. He made his first start on 1 September 2019 against Pergolettese.

Juventus U23 
Capellini's first game for Juventus U23 came on 3 October 2020, in a 2–1 win over Giana Erminio.

Loan to Mirandés 
On 20 July 2021, Capellini was loaned to Spanish side Mirandés in the Segunda División.

Benevento 
On 21 June 2022, Capellini left Juventus to join Benevento.

References

External links
 

2000 births
Living people
Sportspeople from Cremona
Footballers from Lombardy
Italian footballers
Association football defenders
Juventus F.C. players
Juventus Next Gen players
U.S. Pistoiese 1921 players
CD Mirandés footballers
Benevento Calcio players
Serie B players
Serie C players
Segunda División players
Italian expatriate footballers
Italian expatriate sportspeople in Spain
Expatriate footballers in Spain